Yerry Manuel Rodríguez (born October 15, 1997) is a Dominican professional baseball pitcher for the Texas Rangers of Major League Baseball (MLB). He made his MLB debut in 2022.

Career
Rodríguez signed with the Texas Rangers as an international free agent on September 2, 2015. He made his professional debut in 2016 with the DSL Rangers of the Rookie-level Dominican Summer League, going 4–3 with a 2.66 ERA and 38 strikeouts over  innings. He returned to the DSL in 2017, going 1–0 with a 0.00 ERA and 3 strikeouts over just 6 innings. On June 9, 2017, Rodríguez was suspended 75 games after testing positive for Hydrochlorothiazide. He split the 2018 season between the AZL Rangers of the Rookie-level Arizona League and the Spokane Indians of the Class A Short Season Northwest League, going a combined 5–2 with a 2.86 ERA and 82 strikeouts over 63 innings. Rodríguez spent the 2019 season with the Hickory Crawdads of the Class A South Atlantic League, going 7–3 with a 2.08 ERA and 85 strikeouts over  innings. He suffered a right elbow UCL sprain in July 2019, which ended his season but did not require surgery. Rodríguez did not play in 2020 due to the cancellation of the Minor League Baseball season because of the COVID-19 pandemic.

The Rangers added Rodríguez to their 40-man roster after the 2020 season. He opened the 2021 season with the Frisco RoughRiders of the Double-A Central. After posting a 1–1 record with a 2.63 ERA and 63 strikeouts over  innings, he was promoted to the Round Rock Express of the Triple-A West. With Round Rock he struggled to a 3–3 record with a 8.01 ERA and 37 strikeouts over  innings. He spent the 2022 minor league season back with Round Rock, going 4–1 with a 4.27 ERA and 73 strikeouts over 59 innings. 

On October 5, 2022, Rodríguez made his major league debut, pitching a scoreless inning in relief against the New York Yankees. Rodríguez was optioned to Triple-A Round Rock to begin the 2023 season.

See also
 List of Major League Baseball players from the Dominican Republic

References

External links

1997 births
Living people
People from Santiago de los Caballeros
Dominican Republic expatriate baseball players in the United States
 Major League Baseball players from the Dominican Republic
Major League Baseball pitchers
Texas Rangers players
Dominican Summer League Rangers players
Arizona League Rangers players
Spokane Indians players
Hickory Crawdads players
Frisco RoughRiders players
Round Rock Express players